DYAC may refer to:
 DYAC-FM, an AM radio station broadcasting in Cebu City, branded as Q Radio
 DYAC-TV, a defunct TV station broadcasting in Cebu City, branded as S+A Cebu